Section 53 of the Constitution Act, 1867 is a provision of the Constitution of Canada relating to taxation and appropriation statutes.

The Constitution Act, 1867 is the constitutional statute which established Canada.  Originally named the British North America Act, 1867, the Act continues to be the foundational statute for the Constitution of Canada, although it has been amended many times since 1867.  It is now recognised as part of the supreme law of Canada.

Constitution Act, 1867

The Constitution Act, 1867 is part of the Constitution of Canada and thus part of the supreme law of Canada.  It was the product of extensive negotiations by the governments of the British North American provinces in the 1860s. The Act sets out the constitutional framework of Canada, including the structure of the federal government and the powers of the federal government and the provinces.  Originally enacted in 1867 by the British Parliament under the name the British North America Act, 1867, in 1982 the Act was brought under full Canadian control through the Patriation of the Constitution, and was renamed the Constitution Act, 1867.  Since Patriation the Act can only be amended in Canada, under the amending formula set out in the Constitution Act, 1982.

Text of section 53 

Section 53 reads:

Section 53 is found in Part IV of the Constitution Act, 1867, dealing with federal legislative power.  It has not been amended since the Act was enacted in 1867.

Purpose and interpretation

This provision carries forward the principle from the British constitution that appropriation and taxation measures must be based on laws passed by Parliament, and must originate in the lower house.  The control over appropriation and taxation was one of the major issues which led up to the English Civil War.  Following the Glorious Revolution, the Bill of Rights 1689 was passed, which declared:  "That levying money for or to the use of the Crown by pretence of prerogative, without grant of Parliament, for longer time, or in other manner than the same is or shall be granted, is illegal."  From this provision grew the constitutional principle that the government must produce estimates of expenditures to Parliament;  the Commons then considers bills for taxation and appropriation of funds to specific purposes;  followed by the Commons auditing previous expenditures, to ensure they complied with the relevant appropriation acts.

The Supreme Court has given guidance on the scope of section 53 in two major decisions.  In Re Eurig Estate, a majority of the Court held that section 53 implements the principle of "no taxation without representation".  Taxation measures must be authorised by legislation.  The majority found that a probate fee imposed by order-in-council had not been authorised by legislation, and therefore did not comply with section 53.  In a subsequent case, Ontario English Catholic Teachers’ Assn. v. Ontario (Attorney General), the Court held that a law can delegate to the Cabinet the power to impose a tax by order-in-council, provided the delegation is clear and express.

Related provisions

Section 90 of the Act applies various provisions of the Act to the provincial governments, including "provisions relating to appropriation and tax bills". Section 53 therefore applies to the provincial governments in the same way that it applies to the federal government.  Taxation and appropriation matters can only be initiated by the legislative assemblies of each province, not by executive measures.

References 

Constitution of Canada
Canadian Confederation
Federalism in Canada